Karl V. is an opera, described as a Bühnenwerk mit Musik (stage work with music) by Ernst Krenek, his opus 73. The German libretto is by the composer. His student Virginia Seay collaborated with him on the English translation of the libretto.

The first completed full-length twelve-tone opera tells the story of Emperor Charles V's life in a series of flashbacks on a split stage, devices which the composer only much later recognized as "cinematic" in style; there is also some use of Sprechstimme.

History
Originally commissioned in 1930 by the Vienna State Opera for performance in 1934, this much anticipated work became a cause célèbre when the production was cancelled after Krenek was blacklisted in Germany by the Nazi government immediately following the German parliamentary elections in March 1933. The composer believed it was its strong emphasis on Christian universality that made Karl V. "utterly intolerable" to the Nazis. A concert suite for soprano (Fragmente aus dem Bühnenwerk Karl V., Op. 73a) was performed in 1936, and the opera was staged for the first time on 22 June 1938 at the Neues Deutsches Theater in Prague, by which time Krenek had fled overseas. In 1954 he revised the score for the first revival in Germany. A fully staged production of the opera was performed in the Festspielhaus of the Bregenzer Festspiele in the summer of 2008, and is available on DVD.

Roles

Recordings

Krenek: Karl V.  – Radio Symphony Orchestra Vienna
Conductor: Gerd Albrecht
Principal singers: Frank Hoffmann, Hanna Schwarz, Helmut Melchert, Horst Hiestermann, Kristine Ciesinski
Recording date: 14 August 1980
Label: Philips 6769 084 (2 LPs 106 minutes); later on Orfeo d'Or B00004YLCJ (CD)

Krenek: Karl V.  – Bonn Beethovenhalle Orchestra
Conductor: Marc Soustrot
Principal singers: Wolf-Dieter Streicher, David Pittman-Jennings, Martina Borst, Tom Sol, Werner Hollweg, Franziska Hirzel, Andreas Conrad, Christoph Bantzer, Anne Gjevang, Axel Medrok, Florian Mock
Recording date: 14 October 2000
Label: MD&G Records – B00005NSOB (2 CDs 141 minutes)

References
Notes

Sources
 Ogdon, Will, and Ernst Krenek. 1972. "Conversation with Ernst Krenek". Perspectives of New Music 10, no. 2 (Spring–Summer): 102–110.
 Zenck, Claudia Maurer. "The Ship Loaded with Faith and Hope: Krenek's Karl V. and the Viennese Politics of the Thirties". The Musical Quarterly 71, no. 2 (1985): 116–134.

Further reading
 Krenek, Ernst. Selbstdarstellung. Zürich: Atlantis-Verlag, 1948.
 Krenek, Ernst. Horizons Circled: Reflections on My Music. Berkeley: University of California Press, 1974.
 Purkis, Charlotte. "Karl V.", in: The New Grove Dictionary of Opera, edited by Stanley Sadie, 4 volumes. London: Macmillan Press, 1992. 
 Stewart, John L. Ernst Krenek: The Man and His Music. Berkeley: University of California Press, 1991. 
 Tregear, Peter John. "Musical Style and Political Allegory in Krenek's Karl V". Cambridge Opera Journal 13, no. 1 (March 2001): 55–80.

External links

German-language operas
Operas by Ernst Krenek
Operas
Operas set in the 16th century
1938 operas
Cultural depictions of Charles V, Holy Roman Emperor